Judith Dibar-Gohn (born 10 May 1945) is a Romanian former tennis player. She was known as Judith Dibar before marriage.

Dibar-Gohn, Romania's leading player of the early 1970s, represented her country in five ties of the Federation Cup. She played a key role when Romania reached the semifinals in 1973, which was the team's first year in the tournament. The semifinal against South Africa almost didn't take place due to Romania's anti-apartheid policy, with the players initially informed the tie would be boycotted. It wasn't until two-hours before the opening rubber that the players were informed the decision was reversed and that they were allowed to compete.

At the Grand Slams, Dibar-Gohn's best performance was reaching the third round of the 1974 French Open. She made the second round at Wimbledon in 1973, losing to fourth-seeded Chris Evert.

References

External links
 
 
 

1945 births
Living people
Romanian female tennis players
Universiade gold medalists for Romania
Universiade medalists in tennis
Medalists at the 1965 Summer Universiade